The 2021 season was the 12th season for the Indian Premier League franchise Rajasthan Royals. After winning only 5 matches out of 14 matches, they finished seventh in the tournament.

Background

Player retention and transfers 

The Rajasthan Royals retained 17 players and released eight players.

Retained Sanju Samson, Ben Stokes, Jofra Archer, Jos Buttler, Mahipal Lomror, Manan Vohra, Mayank Markande, Rahul Tewatia, Riyan Parag, Shreyas Gopal, Robin Uthappa (traded to Chennai super kings), Jaydev Unadkat, Yashasvi Jaiswal, Anuj Rawat, Kartik Tyagi, David Miller, Andrew Tye

Released Steve Smith, Akash Singh, Aniruddha Joshi, Ankit Rajpoot, Oshane Thomas, Shashank Singh, Tom Curran, Varun Aaron

Added Shivam Dube, Chris Morris, Mustafizur Rahman, Liam Livingstone, Chetan Sakariya, Kuldip Yadav, Akash Singh, K. C. Carriapa

Squad
 Players with international caps are listed in bold.

Administration and support staff

Kit manufacturers and sponsors 

|

Teams and standings

Results by match

League table 2021

League stage

The full schedule was published on the IPL website on 7 March 2021.

Matches

Statistics

Most runs

 Source: Cricinfo

Most Wickets 

 Source: Cricinfo

Player of the match awards

References

2021 Indian Premier League
Rajasthan Royals seasons
2020s in Rajasthan